Karlakoppa is a village in Dharwad district of Karnataka, India.

Demographics 
As of the 2011 Census of India there were 11 households in Karlakoppa and a total population of 49 consisting of 27 males and 22 females. There were 8 children ages 0-6.

References

Villages in Dharwad district